Slagter is a Dutch surname literally meaning butcher. Notable people with the surname include:

Carolina Slagter (born 1994), Dutch water polo player
Tom-Jelte Slagter (born 1989), Dutch cyclist

See also

Occupational surnames